= Gram-mole =

Gram-mole (more correctly Gram-molecule) is a synonym for Mole. See:

- Mole (unit)
- Molar mass
